A meditation (derived from the  Latin  meditatio, from a verb meditari, meaning "to think, contemplate, devise, ponder") is a written work or a discourse intended to express its author's reflections, or to guide others in contemplation. Often they are an author's musings or extended thoughts on deeper philosophical or religious questions. In the case of Marcus Aurelius, writing was therapeutic. He would use writing as a form of therapy, often aiming to write short and memorable paragraphs.  Meditation, as form of writing, is a type of Reflective writing. Often, writings in this style are a form of meditation. Writing, just like meditation, is a form of interfering with one's mind for beneficial purposes. Just like meditation writing deliberately focuses one's mind on the task at hand, restructuring your conscious thoughts.  This idea can very clearly be viewed in Descartes' Meditations. In Meditations Descartes hopes to have his readers follow along in Meditational exercises. As such, he hopes to have readers read the entire Meditations, rather than just a part, explaining that he wants people reading it to be in serious deliberation. Descartes's Meditations offer particular insight into this style of writing, letting us know that meditations is meant to delve into the various aspects of self, and our ideas of ourselves. Often, he is seen as examining the seemingly unconscious ideas of the mind, and bringing them to consciousness. Thereby clarifying ideas in one's own head. Meditations, according to Descartes, are not meant to be an idle task but rather something that should go on to affect all aspects of life: from social interactions, to how we perceive ourselves. Despite the being Descartes perceptions of meditations there are other varieties. Some view meditations more like writing therapy, a way to vent out and deal with one's emotions, whereas Descartes and the stoics viewed meditations as a form of contemplation, as mentioned above. 

Examples of meditations are:
 Thomas Traherne's Centuries of Meditations
 T.S. Eliot's Four Quartets
 Meditations a series of personal writings by Marcus Aurelius, Roman Emperor 161–180 CE, setting forth his ideas on Stoic philosophy
 Meditations on First Philosophy by René Descartes

Meditation
Literary genres

References